Sacred Heart school may refer to any of numerous educational institutions, including:

Tertiary education 
 Sacred Heart University of Puerto Rico
 Sacred Heart University, Connecticut
 University of the Sacred Heart, Tokyo, Tokyo, Japan

Primary and secondary education

Asia

Bahrain 
 Sacred Heart School (Bahrain), Isa Town

India 
 Sacred Heart Boys High School, Mumbai
 Sacred Heart Convent School (Jamshedpur)
 Sacred Heart School, Golaghat
 Sacred Heart School, Rayagada

Japan 
 International School of the Sacred Heart, Tokyo

Malaysia 
 SMK Sacred Heart, Sibu (secondary school)
Sacred Heart Primary School, Sibu
Sacred Heart Primary School, Kota Kinabalu
Sacred Heart Primary School, Sarawak
Sacred Heart Primary School, Melaka

Pakistan 
 Sacred Heart High School for Boys, Lahore
 Sacred Heart High School for Girls, Lahore

Philippines 
 Sacred Heart School – Ateneo de Cebu, Cebu
 Sacred Heart School – Bauang La Union
 Sacred Heart of Jesus Catholic School, Santa Mesa, Manila
 Sacred Heart Academy of Santa Maria Bulacan, Santa Maria, Bulacan

Sri Lanka 
 Sacred Heart Convent Galle

Taiwan 
 Sacred Heart Girls High School (Taiwan)

Thailand 
 Sacred Heart Convent School (Bangkok)

Republic of Korea 
 Sacred Heart High School for Girls (Seoul)
 Sacred Heart Middle School for Girls (Seoul)

Australia 
 Sacred Heart School, Launceston

Europe

England 
 Sacred Heart School, Hove, Sussex, closed in 1966, the site is now Cardinal Newman Catholic School
 Beechwood Sacred Heart School, Tunbridge Wells, Kent
 Sacred Heart Language College, Harrow, London
 Sacred Heart Catholic School, Camberwell, London
 Sacred Heart Primary School, Teddington, London
 Sacred Heart Catholic High School, Crosby, Merseyside
 Sacred Heart Catholic Secondary, in Redcar, North Yorkshire
 Sacred Heart Catholic Voluntary Academy, Leicester

France 
 Sacred Heart Elementary School (Paris)
 Free Institution of Sacred Heart (Institution Libre du Sacré-Cœur), Tourcoing

Northern Ireland 
 Sacred Heart Grammar School, Newry, Co.Down, Northern Ireland

Scotland 
 Kilgraston School, Bridge of Earn, Perthshire

Spain 
 Sacred Heart School, Logroño

North America

Canada 
 Sacred Heart School (Langton), Ontario
 Sacred Heart School of Halifax, Halifax, Nova Scotia
 Sacred Heart School of Montreal, Montréal, Quebec

United States 

 Sacred Heart of Jesus Catholic School (McClellan, Alabama)
 Sacred Heart Catholic School (Morrilton, Arkansas)
 Sacred Heart Preparatory (Atherton, California)
 Sacred Heart School (Covina, California)
 Sacred Heart Cathedral Preparatory, San Francisco, California
 Sacred Heart School (Saratoga, California)
 Sacred Heart of Jesus School (Du Quoin), Illinois (Closed 2008)
 Sacred Heart School (Lombard, Illinois)
 Sacred Heart School (Dubuque, Iowa)
 Sacred Heart School (Fall River, Massachusetts)
 Sacred Heart Elementary School (Weymouth), Massachusetts
 Sacred Heart High School (Hattiesburg, Mississippi)
 Sacred Heart School (Hampton, New Hampshire)
 Sacred Heart School (Mount Ephraim), New Jersey
 Sacred Heart School (Hartsdale), New York
 Sacred Heart of Jesus School New York
 Sacred Heart School (Bethlehem), Pennsylvania
 Country Day School of the Sacred Heart, Bryn Mawr, Pennsylvania
 Sacred Heart Elementary (Carbondale), Pennsylvania
 Sacred Heart Catholic School (Muenster, Texas)

Africa

Ghana 

 Sacred Heart Senior High School, Nsoatre

See also 
 List of Schools of the Sacred Heart
 Sacred Heart (disambiguation)
 Sacred Heart Academy (disambiguation)
 Sacred Heart College (disambiguation)
 Sacred Heart High School (disambiguation)
 Convent of the Sacred Heart (disambiguation)
 Our Lady of the Sacred Heart (disambiguation)

Sacred Heart Secondary School in Africa, South Africa, Kwazulu Natal, Verulam in OAKFORD near OAKFORD primary school (associated)but children coming from that primary school pay less than the children coming from other primaries in the earliest past Sacred heart secondary school was known for its education but now it has become less of inspiration it has changed even children are complaining people are hoping things would change it is also a boarding school for girls actually it is a school for girls.